Babay or Babai is a night spirit (Bogeyman) in Slavic folklore. According to beliefs, he abducts children who do not sleep at night or behave badly. He is also called Babayka or Babayko (Ukrainian: Бабáйко), although the term may also be applied to his female equivalent.

Role and characteristics
Babay is rarely described, so that children can imagine him in the form most terrible for them. However, sometimes Babay is described as a pitch-black and crooked old man. He has some physical defects, such as muteness, armlessness, and/or lameness. Babay has a bag and a cane. It is believed that he lives in the forest, in a swamp or in a garden. At night, he wanders through the streets and puts into his bag those who meet him on the way. Walking near houses, Babay stands close to the windows and watches the children. If they are awake, he starts to make scary noises, such as rustling, gritting and knocking on the window. Also, Babay can sometimes hide under the child's bed, and he may take them if they get up. 

Babay is often mentioned in lullabies, usually with instructions not to come for the child:

Etymology
The term babay, alongside its synonym, baba, is most likely of Turkic origin. It is translated as "grandfather", "old man" from the Tatar language.

References

Bibliography

Russian folklore
Russian mythology
Slavic legendary creatures
Muteness
Bogeymen